Ashted (alternatively spelt Ashstead and Ashtead) is an area of Birmingham in the United Kingdom, within the ward of Nechells. It is within the boundaries of Nechells Green, and provides mainly estate and high-rise residences.

History 
The settlement takes its name from the physician John Ash, who leased the property from Sir Lester Holte and in 1771 built a grand house surrounded by fields, gardens and orchards.  He never occupied the house, selling the lease to John Brooke, a Birmingham attorney.  Brooke laid out streets and divided the property into parcels with the intention of bringing wealth to the area; many affluent entrepreneurs were living in Birmingham during the Industrial Revolution.  In 1791, after Brooke added a cupola, Dr. Ash's house was opened as the church of St James the Less.  The Ashted Barracks were erected next to the church in 1791 following the Priestley Riots. In 1809, the church passed into a trust and was consecrated in 1810.

Thirty-eight years later, in 1848, Samuel Lewis's Topographical Dictionary of England counted the population as approximately 25,000, and stated that the settlement's proximity to the city centre gave huge advantage to trade and industry.

Towards the end of the 19th century, the status of the area dropped and it became a high-density working class area, with many slums.

The church was demolished in 1956, having sustained heavy bombing during World War II.

Transport 
The A47 Jennens Road crosses  The Middleway at Ashted, located between Dartmouth Circus via Dartmouth Middleway; and via Lawley Middleway, Garrison Circus.

Ashted Tunnel on the Digbeth Branch Canal provides water transport under the A47 Jennens Road.

References 

Areas of Birmingham, West Midlands